Sharifabad (also Romanized as Sharīfābād) is a city in, and the capital of, Sharifabad District of Pakdasht County, Tehran province, Iran. At the 2006 census, its population was 8,870 in 2,249 households. The following census in 2011 counted 12,332 people in 3,384 households. The latest census in 2016 showed a population of 18,281 people in 5,368 households.

References 

Pakdasht County

Cities in Tehran Province

Populated places in Tehran Province

Populated places in Pakdasht County